Noblesville Township is one of nine townships in Hamilton County, Indiana, United States. As of the 2010 census, its population was 50,564 and it contained 20,122 housing units.

History
Noblesville Township was organized in 1827.

The Holliday Hydroelectric Powerhouse and Dam and Potter's Covered Bridge are listed on the National Register of Historic Places.

Geography
The streams of Cicero Creek, Dry Branch, East Fork Sly Run, Lily Vestal Drain, Hinkle Creek, Ingerman Ditch, Kirkendall Creek, Mallery Granger Ditch, Overdorff Branch, Stony Creek, and West Fork Sly Run run through this township.

Cities and towns
 Noblesville (vast majority)

Unincorporated communities

 Riverwood

Adjacent townships
 Jackson Township (north)
 White River Township (northeast)
 Wayne Township (east)
 Fall Creek Township (southeast)
 Delaware Township (south)
 Clay Township (southwest)
 Washington Township (west)

Cemeteries
The township contains eight cemeteries: Crownland, Gascho-Trissel, Gray, Hurlock, Riverside, Thorp, Weaver and Zimmer.

Major highways
 Indiana State Road 19
 Indiana State Road 32
 Indiana State Road 37
 Indiana State Road 38
 Indiana State Road 238

Airports and landing strips
 Roberts-Jacobi Restricted Airport

Education
Noblesville Township residents may obtain a free library card from the Hamilton East Public Library in Noblesville city.

References
 U.S. Board on Geographic Names (GNIS)
 United States Census Bureau cartographic boundary files

External links
 Indiana Township Association
 United Township Association of Indiana

Townships in Hamilton County, Indiana
Townships in Indiana